Naval Outlying Landing Field (NOLF) Holley was a naval outlying landing field of the larger Naval Air Station Whiting Field located within the city limits of the community of Navarre, Florida. The runways were restricted to limited military use only; however, in 2017, the Gulf Power company was authorized to build a solar power plant on the facility grounds. The plant now provides power for some 18,000 homes, making it one of the largest solar fields in the region. The solar panels completely cover what was once the runways.

See also
Naval Air Station Pensacola
Santa Rosa County

References

Defunct airports in Florida
Navarre, Florida
Transportation buildings and structures in Santa Rosa County, Florida
Holley
Closed installations of the United States Navy